Ruby Hall Clinic is a prominent hospital in the city of Pune, India. It is a 750-bed hospital with a staff of 300 consultants, 650 panel doctors and 1500 paramedical staff. It is accredited by National Accreditation Board for Hospitals & Healthcare Providers (NABH).

It is a recognized Post Graduate Teaching Hospital for the students of Maharashtra University of Health Sciences, National Board of Examinations and College of Physicians & Surgeons of Mumbai. Dr. P.K. Grant is the managing trustee of Ruby Hall Clinic.

History
Ruby Hall Clinic was established in 1959 by Dr. K B Grant. In 1966, Ruby Hall Clinic was converted from a private institution owned by Dr. Grant to a public charitable trust;- Poona Medical Foundation. It was later converted to the Grant Medical Foundation in 2000, of which Dr. Grant was the chairman and managing trustee. 

The clinic in collaboration with Kalyani Group announced to launch a special institute for research of prostate cancer.

Awards and accolades
Ruby Hall has been awarded the Best Healthcare Brand 2016 by the ET.

The CEO of Ruby Hall has been listed among the top 25 Living Legends of Healthcare in India.

Having branches at Sassoon Road, Hinjewadi and Wanowrie, Ruby Hall is one of the most renowned hospitals of Maharashtra. It is also a preferred destination for overseas patients with it being awarded numerous times by the Times Group for being a Hospital par Excellence in Medical Tourism.

Facilities
Ruby Hall Clinic has state of the art facilities in Cardiology, Cardiac Surgery, Neurology, Nuclear Medicine Department (Digital PET-CT & SPECT CT), Diagnostic Center, Intensive Care Units, a Blood Bank and Cancer Unit. In 1999, the hospital ranked first in India for having the largest number of ICU beds (i.e. 76, ahead of other renowned hospitals like Bombay Hospital, Jaslok Hospital, Hinduja Hospital, etc). The number of ICU beds available now has increased to 130.

Recently, Times Of India in its Pune Mirror Section, named the IVF Centre of Ruby Hall Clinic as the best in West India and among the Top 10 of India. The IVF Centre has seen alarge amount growth over the past decade and has become a popular destination for the patients from Pune and surrounding areas.

Academics
Ruby Hall Clinic, apart from being a multi-specialty tertiary care hospital, is also a preferred destination for medical students as a student friendly academic institute.

Large work load in various specialties & super specialties, experienced consultants, teaching aids & infrastructure, study models (such as journal clubs), clinical meetings, workshops, etc. ensure students achieve technical & professional excellence.

The hospital runs various diploma, DNB and fellowship courses with MUHS, NBE & CPS Mumbai.

Regular seminars and theory classes add to its student friendly appeal. It has been the institution of choice for students opting for specialties like radio-diagnosis, dermatology, medicine and orthopedic surgery.

Controversies

Despite being a leading hospital in Pune, Ruby Hall Clinic has received many complaints and has had several accusations of medical negligence.

 Urmila Santosh Jagdale, lost her eye sight due to an excess amount of anesthesia administered during a (possibly needless) surgery at Ruby Hall Clinic, Pune in December of 2008. Pune District Consumer Grievance Redressal Forum found Ruby Hall Clinic negligent and asked to pay INR 1,150,000 to her family in compensation.
 Suman D. Mane filed a consumer complaint (Case No. CC/11/96) of medical negligence with Maharashtra State Consumer Disputes Redressal and alleged that Late Dattajirao Balwantrao Mane's death on 11 November 2009.  Dattajirao Mane had a bypass surgery and his kin alleged that incompetence and negligence post-surgery led to his demise. This case was dismissed as the complainants failed to show substantial evidence of negligence.

 Aman Galande, a 19 year old who was admitted for pneumonia died in Ruby Hall Clinic's ICU in August of 2013 due to alleged negligence in treating him. Following this incident, an angry mob vandalized the hospital.

 Dr. Lamkhede, who was admitted in ICU for rapidly deteriorated health following his first chemotherapy round administered in Ruby Hall Clinic, died of cardiac arrest caused by endotracheal suctioning. His family also accused the staff for his mistreatment and death in June of 2014.
 Ashok N. Kulkarni died on 21st Sept, 2015. His daughter Anjali Kulkarni claims severe delay in responding to her father deteriorating medical condition and improper medications while hospitalized as the primary cause of his death

 A criminal case was filed on 31 August 2016 against Ruby Hall Clinic for causing death of Nandakumar Hiwarkar (age 42) in 2015. His brother also claims cheating by the hospital by serving them a INR 35,000,000 bill. Ruby Hall Clinic is contesting that this complaint is malicious.

 Advocate Ashutosh Srivastava recently filed a police complaint under offence of murder with the Koregaon police station, alleging negligence and cruelty, leading to the death of his 54-year-old mother.

 Pune City Police started probing allegations of malpractice in a kidney transplant procedure conducted at Ruby Hall Clinic, where a woman was allegedly fraudulently presented as the organ receiver’s wife and was also promised a large sum of money in return.

References

External links
Official site

Buildings and structures in Maharashtra
Hospitals in Pune
Hospitals established in 1959
1959 establishments in Bombay State